Mozes Jacobs (26 November 1905 – 9 July 1943) was a Dutch gymnast. He competed in seven events at the 1928 Summer Olympics. He was killed in the Sobibor extermination camp during World War II.

References

External links
 

1905 births
1943 deaths
Dutch male artistic gymnasts
Olympic gymnasts of the Netherlands
Gymnasts at the 1928 Summer Olympics
Dutch people who died in Sobibor extermination camp
Gymnasts from Amsterdam
Dutch civilians killed in World War II